The Apostolic Constitutions or Constitutions of the Holy Apostles (Latin: Constitutiones Apostolorum) is a Christian collection divided into eight books which is classified among the Church Orders, a genre of early Christian literature, that offered authoritative pseudo-apostolic prescriptions on moral conduct, liturgy and Church organization. The work can be dated from 375 to 380 AD. The provenance is usually regarded as Syria, probably Antioch. The author is unknown, although since James Ussher it has often considered to be the author of the letters of Pseudo-Ignatius, perhaps the 4th-century Eunomian bishop Julian of Cilicia.

Content
The Apostolic Constitutions contains eight books on Early Christian discipline, worship, and doctrine, apparently intended to serve as a manual of guidance for the clergy, and to some extent for the laity. It purports to be the work of the Twelve Apostles, whether given by them as individuals or as a body.

The structure of the Apostolic Constitutions can be summarized:
 Books 1 to 6 are a free re-wording of the Didascalia Apostolorum, an earlier work of the same genre.
 Book 7 is partially based on the Didache. Chapters 33-45 of book 7 contain prayers similar to Jewish prayers used in synagogues.
 Book 8 is a more complex section composed as follows:
 chapters 1-2 contain an extract of a lost treatise on the charismata
 chapters 3-46 are based on the Apostolic Tradition, greatly expanded, along with other material
 chapter 47 is known as the Canons of the Apostles and it had a wider circulation than the rest of the book.

The best manuscript, Vatican gr 1506, has Arian leanings, which are not found in other manuscripts because this material would have been censured as heretical.

The Apostolic Constitutions is an important source for the history of the liturgy in the Antiochene rite. It contains an outline of an anaphora in book two, a full anaphora in book seven (which is an expansion of the one found in the Didache), and the complete Liturgy of the eighth book of the Apostolic Constitutions, which is the oldest known form that can be described as a complete divine liturgy.

Influence
In antiquity, the Apostolic Constitutions were mistakenly supposed to be gathered and handed down by Clement of Rome, the authority of whose name gave weight to more than one such piece of early Christian literature (see also Clementine literature).

The Church seems never to have regarded this work as of undoubted apostolic authority. The Apostolic Constitutions were rejected as apocryphal by the Decretum Gelasianum. The Quinisext Council in 692 rejected most part of the work on account of the interpolations of heretics. Only that portion of Book 8 which has been given the name Canons of the Apostles was received in the Eastern Christianity. Even if not regarded as of certain Apostolic origin, however, in antiquity the Apostolic Constitutions were held generally in high esteem and served as the basis for much ecclesiastical legislation. The Apostolic Constitutions were accepted as canonical by John of Damascus and, in a modified form, included in the 81 book canon of the Ethiopian Orthodox Church.

Even if the text of the Apostolic Constitutions was extant in many libraries during the Middle Ages, it was largely ignored. In 1546 a Latin version of a text was found in Crete and published. The first complete edition of the Greek text was printed in 1563 by Turrianus.

William Whiston in the 18th century devoted the third volume of his Primitive Christianity Revived to prove that "they are the most sacred of the canonical books of the New Testament; "for "these sacred Christian laws or constitutions were delivered at Jerusalem, and in Mount Sion, by our Saviour to the eleven apostles there assembled after His resurrection."

Today the Apostolic Constitutions are regarded as a highly significant historical document, as they reveal the moral and religious conditions, as well as the liturgical observances of 3rd and 4th centuries. They are part of the Ante-Nicene Fathers collection.

Canons of the Apostles

The forty-seventh and last chapter of the eighth book of the Apostolic Constitutions contains the eighty-five Canons of the Apostles, which present themselves as being from an apostolic Council at Antioch. These canons were later approved by the Eastern Council in Trullo in 692 but rejected by Pope Constantine. In the Latin Church only fifty of these canons circulated, translated to Latin by Dionysius Exiguus on about 500 AD, and included in the Western collections and afterwards in the Corpus Juris Canonici.

Canon n. 85 is a list of canonical books: a 46-book Old Testament canon which essentially corresponds to that of the Septuagint, 26 books of what is now the New Testament (excludes Revelation), two Epistles of Clement, and the Apostolic Constitutions themselves, also here attributed to Clement, at least as compiler.

Epitome of the eighth book  
It is also known as the Epitome, and usually named Epitome of the eighth Book of the Apostolic Constitutions (or sometime titled The Constitutions of the Holy Apostles concerning ordination through Hippolytus or simply The Constitutions through Hippolytus) containing a re-wording of chapters 1–2, 4–5, 16–28, 30–34, 45-46 of the eighth book. The text was first published by Paul de Lagarde in 1856 and later by Franz Xaver von Funk in 1905. This epitome could be a later extract even if in parts it looks nearer to the Greek original of the Apostolic Tradition, from which the 8th book is derived, than the Apostolic Constitutions themselves.

See also

 Apostolic Church-Ordinance
 Alexandrine Sinodos
 Jus antiquum
 Verona Palimpsest

Notes

External links
 
 Apostolic Constitutions: online English text from the Ante-Nicene Fathers
 Jewish Encyclopedia: Didascalia
  This contains a more detailed exegesis of the writings and their possible authorship.
 Schaff-Herzog Encyclopedia of Religious Knowledge: Apostolic Constitutions and Canons

Ancient church orders
4th-century books
4th-century Christian texts
Christian terminology
Canon law codifications
Works of unknown authorship
Christianity in Syria